Oswald Pornbacher was an Italian luger who competed in the late 1970s and early 1980s. A natural track luger, he won the gold medal in the men's doubles event at the 1980 FIL World Luge Natural Track Championships in Passeier, Italy.

Pornbacher also won two medals in the men's doubles event at the FIL European Luge Natural Track Championships with a gold in 1981 and a bronze in 1979.

References
Natural track European Championships results 1970-2006.
Natural track World Championships results: 1979-2007

Italian lugers
Italian male lugers
Year of birth missing (living people)
Living people
Sportspeople from Südtirol